Séverine Vandenhende (born 12 January 1974 in Dechy) is a French judoka, world champion and Olympic champion. She won a gold medal in the half middleweight division at the 2000 Summer Olympics in Sydney.

She received a gold medal at the 1997 World Judo Championships.

References

External links
 
 
 

1974 births
Living people
Sportspeople from Nord (French department)
French people of Flemish descent
French female judoka
Olympic judoka of France
Judoka at the 2000 Summer Olympics
Olympic gold medalists for France
Olympic medalists in judo
Medalists at the 2000 Summer Olympics
Universiade medalists in judo
Universiade silver medalists for France
Medalists at the 1995 Summer Universiade